From One Friday to the Next (Od petka do petka) is a 1985 Croatian film directed by Antun Vrdoljak, starring Boris Dvornik and Zdravka Krstulović.

References

External links
 

1985 films
Croatian comedy-drama films
1980s Croatian-language films
Yugoslav comedy-drama films
Films set in Yugoslavia